= College of Medical Technology, Kyoto University =

Junior college in Kyoto, Japan

- 京都大学医療技術短期大学部
- Type: National
- Active: 1975–2007
- Location: Kyoto, Japan
- Website: www.kyoto-u.ac.jp/ja/profile/intro/president/archive/070425_2.htm

The College of Medical Technology, Kyoto University (京都大学医療技術短期大学部, Kyōto Daigaku Iryō Gijutsu Tanki Daigakubu) was a national junior college in the city of Kyoto, Japan.

== History ==
The college opened in 1975, affiliated with Kyoto University, and consisted of four departments. It closed in 2007.

== Courses ==
It offered courses in nursing, medical laboratory science, physiotherapy, occupational therapy, and midwifery.
